Wheaton is one of two stations on Metra's Union Pacific West Line, located in Wheaton, Illinois. The station is located at 402 Front Street. Unless otherwise announced, inbound trains use the north platform and outbound trains use the south platform.

As of December 5, 2022, Wheaton is served by 53 trains (26 inbound, 27 outbound) on weekdays, by all 10 trains in each direction on Saturdays, and by all nine trains in each direction on Sundays and holidays. One outbound train terminates at Wheaton on weekdays.

Wheaton station is located at ground level and consists of two side platforms. Three tracks run between the platforms, though one does not access the station. There is a station house next to the north track, which is open 5 AM – 6 PM. Tickets are available at the station house on weekdays.

Bus connections
Pace
  301 Roosevelt Road 
  709 Carol Stream/North Wheaton 
  711 Wheaton/Addison 
  714 College of DuPage/Naperville/Wheaton Connector

References

External links 

Metra stations in Illinois
Former Chicago and North Western Railway stations
Buildings and structures in Wheaton, Illinois
Railway stations in DuPage County, Illinois
Railway stations in the United States opened in 1912
Union Pacific West Line